Zatrephes foliacea is a moth of the family Erebidae. It was described by Walter Rothschild in 1909. It is found in Brazil.

References

 

Phaegopterina
Moths described in 1909